Myukhrek is a rural locality (a selo) in Myukhrekskoye Rural Settlement, Rutulsky District, Republic of Dagestan, Russia. The population was 193 as of 2010. There is 1 street.

Geography 
Myukhrek is located on the Samur ridge, 23 km northwest of Rutul (the district's administrative centre) by road. Tsudik and Dzhilikhur are the nearest rural localities.

Nationalities 
Rutuls live there.

References 

Rural localities in Rutulsky District